"I'm a Good Man" is a song by French DJ and record producer Martin Solveig. The song was released in the United Kingdom as a digital download in June 2004. It was released as the third and final single from his debut studio album Sur la terre (2002). The song was written and produced by Martin Solveig. The song peaked at number 57 on the UK Singles Chart.

Track listing

Chart performance

Weekly charts

Release history

References

2004 singles
2004 songs
Martin Solveig songs
Songs written by Martin Solveig